Kurkino District is a district of North-Western Administrative Okrug of the federal city of Moscow, Russia. It is just outside the Moscow Ring Road, 19 km northwest of the center of Moscow. Population: 30,000 (Est. 2017)

Geography
The neighborhood is located out of MKAD, on the northwest of Moscow. It boards the city of Khimki.

History
The district was established in 1992.

References

Districts of Moscow
North-Western Administrative Okrug